Ophiodermella fancherae is a species of sea snail, a marine gastropod mollusk in the family Borsoniidae.

Description
The length of the shell attains 17.7 mm, its diameter 3 mm.

(Original description) The shell is slender and elongate. It has a dark reddish-brown color when fresh. The smooth protoconch is somewhat swollen and contains about two whorls. The subsequent whorls number about six or seven. They are similarly sculptured: axial sculpture consists of numerous low slender flexuous riblets with wider interspaces, extending from the suture to the periphery and become obsolete on the base of the shell. These are crossed (between the sutures) by from four to six spiral subequal threads, of which those on the periphery are somewhat more prominent, and all are slightly 
nodulous where they override the ribleis. On the base there are about 15 of these threads with somewhat wider interspaces. The aperture is rather narrow. The outer lip is sharp and flexuous. The anal sulcus is wide and shallow, halfway between the suture and the periphery. The columellar lip is smooth. The siphonal canal is rather Iong, straight, and open.

Distribution
This species occurs in the Pacific Ocean off California, USA to Lower California, Mexico.

References

 Dall W.H. 1919. Descriptions of new species of mollusks of the family Turritidae from the west coast of America and adjacent regions. Proceedings of the United States National Museum 56(2288):l-86; pis. 1-24 (Aug. 8).
 Dall W.H., 1921. Summary of the marine shellbearing mollusks of the northwest coast of America, from San Diego, California, to the Polar Sea, mostly contained in the collection of the United States National Museum, with illustrations of hitherto unfigured species. United States National Museum Bulletin 112: 217 pp.; pis. 1-22 
 Carol Skoglund, Ophiodermalla fancherae (Dall, 1903),( Mollusca, Turridae) found in the Gulf of California, Mexico; the Festivus  vol. 26 (1994), p. 127
 McLean J.H. (1996). The Prosobranchia. In: Taxonomic Atlas of the Benthic Fauna of the Santa Maria Basin and Western Santa Barbara Channel. The Mollusca Part 2 – The Gastropoda. Santa Barbara Museum of Natural History. volume 9: 1–160.

External links
  Bouchet P., Kantor Yu.I., Sysoev A. & Puillandre N. (2011) A new operational classification of the Conoidea. Journal of Molluscan Studies 77: 273-308.

fancherae
Gastropods described in 1903